The Føroya Politi or Løgregla Føroya (Faroe Islands Police) are an independent police district within Denmark. The chief constable, who is known as the 'Landsfúti' is based in Tórshavn.

Notes

See also
Rigspolitiet - National police of Denmark

 
Law enforcement in Denmark
Government of the Faroe Islands
Enforcement